Task Force 121 was a United States Department of Defense special operations task force. TF121 was a multi-service force from Joint Special Operations Command, made up of operators from the U.S. Army's Delta Force, 75th Ranger Regiment, and 160th Special Operations Aviation Regiment, the U.S. Navy's SEAL Team Six, the CIA's Special Activities Division, U.S. Air Force Combat Controllers, Pararescuemen, Tactical Air Control Party operators, and Special Operations Weather Technicians, the Aviation Tactics Evaluation Group (AvTEG), and the Joint Communications Unit. Two companies of armor from the U.S. Army 4th Infantry Division provided armor support.

History 
TF121 was a combination of the now defunct Task Force 5 and Task Force 20, which operated in Afghanistan and Iraq respectively. Acting on the apparent logistic redundancy of keeping two separate task force teams for Iraq and Afghanistan, General John Abizaid decided to combine both teams into a single streamlined force, forming the TF121. The force was approximately 1,500 soldiers with its own support capabilities.

Task Force 20's primary goal was to capture or kill "High-value targets" (HVTs), such as Iraqi Mujahideen leaders and former Ba'ath party regime members and leaders. Task Force 20 operators were directly involved in the 4-hour firefight between 101st Airborne soldiers and Saddam Hussein's sons, Uday and Qusay Hussein. The two sons were killed in the shootout. The apprehending of the most wanted man in Iraq, Saddam Hussein, in Operation Red Dawn directly involved Task Force 121 operators and members of the Army's 4th Infantry Division.

Task Force 20 was also involved in what the US military calls a tragic accident on 27 July 2003. At least three Iraqis were killed in western Baghdad's Mansour district, when US soldiers from Task Force 20 opened fire on cars that overshot a military cordon. The drivers apparently had missed the cordon when they turned into the area from an unblocked side street.

Mission 
TF121's primary mission was the apprehension of High Value Targets and was organized in such a way that it has a close relationship with intelligence personnel and has timely and unhindered access to any relevant data gathered by intelligence assets in the area. Such an option is invaluable to any Special Operations team, and especially so to one whose primary mission is hunting elusive fugitives whose hideouts change frequently and randomly.

Many TF121 groups were assigned Special Operations CIRA (Communications Intelligence Reconnaissance and Action) personnel with expertise in relevant fields. These operators work closely with the intelligence agencies tied to TF121 and work to pinpoint and identify HVTs aggressively.

Achievements 
On 21 July 2003, Saddam's sons Uday and Qusay were killed in a firefight with TF20 operators and soldiers from 101st Airborne. On 13 December 2003, Operation Red Dawn netted HVT #1, Saddam Hussein. After intelligence narrowed down the target to two possible locations, TF121 coordinated the raid with 600 soldiers from the 4th Infantry Division's 1st Brigade Combat Team and Apache Troop 1-1 Cavalry Regiment, 4th Brigade, 1st Armored Division.

Detainee abuse 
According to an internal army investigation leaked to the Washington Post, Task Force 121 was responsible for the illegal abuse of detainees in secret interrogation facilities in Iraq. In 2006, after the unit had changed its name to Task Force 6-26, a Human Rights Watch report recorded evidence of continued abuse, including beatings and waterboarding.

Cultural references
 Groove Games' Combat:Task Force 121
 Call of Duty: Modern Warfare 2 and 3 includes a top secret joint operations task force named "Task Force 141." The primary purpose of the video game's organization, as in its supposed real life counterpart, is to take on and either kill or capture high priority individuals. Unlike Task Force 121, it is a primarily multinational force.
The Colbert Report used Task Force 121 as an example of a "secret" task force in its television episode airing on 27 September 2010.

See also
 Joint Special Operations Command Task Force in the Iraq War
 Articles on later incarnations of the same unit, Task Force 145 and Task Force 6-26.

References

Bibliography
 Has a few impressions of the arrival of Task Force 121 in Shaffer's location.

Special forces task forces of the United States
Joint task forces of the United States Armed Forces
Occupation of Iraq